An inch is a unit of measurement.

Inch or inches may also refer to

Units
 Inch as a measurement of rain, as measured by a rain gauge
Inch of mercury, a unit of pressure
Inch of water, a unit of pressure
Scottish inch, a Scottish unit of measurement
Column inch, a unit of publication measurement
Gear inches, a measure of bicycle gearing
Miner's inch, a unit of flow
Pyramid inch, a unit used by pyramidologists

Places

"Inch" in Scottish and Irish placenames (an anglicisation of the Gaelic innis) usually meaning an island (often an islet) or meadow:

Ireland
Inch, County Clare, a town
Inch, County Cork, a village
Inch, County Kerry, a town
Inch, County Laois, a townland in County Laois
Inch, County Wexford, a town
Inch, County Wicklow, a civil parish in County Wicklow
Inch, Inch, a townland in the parish of the same name in County Tipperary
Inch Island, County Donegal
The Inch, Dublin, a cricket ground in Fingal, Ireland

New Zealand
Inch Valley, a locality near Otago

Northern Ireland
Inch, County Down, a townland in County Down
Inch Abbey, a ruined monastic site in County Down

Scotland
Inch, Dumfries and Galloway, a civil parish in Dumfries and Galloway
The Inch, Edinburgh, a suburb of southern Edinburgh
Inch, an islet off St Mary's Isle Priory in Dumfries and Galloway
Inch Kenneth, an islet off the west coast of the Isle of Mull
North Inch and South Inch, public parks in Perth

See also
Insch, a town in Aberdeenshire, Scotland
Insh, a village in the Highland Council Area of Scotland

People with the surname
Richard Inch (1843–1911), an American admiral
Adam Inch (1857–1933), a Scottish-Canadian farmer and politician
Robert Alexander Inch (1873–1961), an American judge
Thomas Inch (1881–1963), British "strongest man"

Other
USS Inch (DE-146), an American naval ship
Big Inch, a 1942 American oil pipeline
Inches, a gay monthly publication established by George W. Mavety
 Inches (album), a music album by Les Savy Fav
 Inch (band), a 90s pop-punk band from San Diego

See also

, including islands starting with "Inch"
 Insh (disambiguation)